Gondolella is an extinct genus of conodonts in the family Gondolellidae.

References

External links 

 
 

Ozarkodinida genera
Pennsylvanian conodonts
Fossil taxa described in 1932